Timeline Ltd. was an American game company that produced role-playing games and game supplements.

History
Timeline is the publisher of The Morrow Project (1980).

Timeline Ltd. also published the role-playing game Time & Time Again in 1984.

References

Role-playing game publishing companies